Penry v. Johnson, 532 U.S. 782 (2001), is a United States Supreme Court case which concerned whether instructions given to a Texas jury were constitutionally adequate to emphasize the mitigating factors in sentencing of defendants who are intellectually disabled ("retarded" in the Court's words.) The Texas courts had determined the sentencing instructions were consistent with prior Supreme Court jurisprudence, but the Court in a divided decision reversed, finding the sentencing instructions insufficient. This was the second time Penry's case made it to the Supreme Court.

Background
In 1989, the U.S. Supreme Court held in Penry v. Lynaugh that Johnny Paul Penry had been sentenced to death in violation of the Eighth Amendment after finding that Texas' special instruction questions did not permit the jury to consider mitigating evidence involving his mental retardation. On retrial in 1990, Penry was again found guilty of murder. The defense again put on evidence regarding Penry's mental impairments. Ultimately, a psychiatric evaluation, which stated that Penry would be dangerous to others if released, prepared at the request of Penry's former counsel, was cited. Upon submission to the jury, the trial judge instructed the jury to determine Penry's sentence by answering the same special questions in the first trial. Additionally, the trial judge gave a supplemental instruction on mitigating evidence. The court sentenced Penry to death in connection with the jury's answers to the special issues. In affirming the verdict, the Texas Court of Criminal Appeals rejected Penry's claims that the admission of language from the psychiatric evaluation violated his Fifth Amendment privilege against self-incrimination, and that the jury instructions were constitutionally inadequate because they did not permit the jury to consider his specific mitigating evidence. Penry's petitions for state and federal habeas corpus relief failed.

Opinion of the Court
The decision of the Court, authored by Justice Sandra Day O'Connor, was in two parts. Firstly, the Court was unanimous in finding that the inclusion of the psychiatric report was constitutional. O'Connor expressed "considerable doubt" that the psychiatric report "even if erroneous, had a 'substantial and injurious effect'" on the outcome of the trial. However, the Court split 6-3 on whether the supplemental jury instructions on mitigating evidence were constitutionally adequate; the majority holding they were not. "Any realistic assessment of the manner in which the supplemental instruction operated would therefore lead to the same conclusion we reached in Penry I," wrote Justice O'Connor "'A reasonable juror could well have believed that there was no vehicle for expressing the view that Penry did not deserve to be sentenced to death based upon his mitigating evidence.'" Therefore, the case was sent back to Texas for renewed sentencing. Justice Clarence Thomas wrote a dissent as to this part of the decision, joined by then-Chief Justice William Rehnquist and Justice Scalia. Thomas explained that he disagreed with the majority "...because I believe the most recent sentencing court gave the jurors an opportunity to consider the evidence Penry presented". He concluded by attacking the standards the majority used to define proper sentencing instructions, saying the Court was sending "mixed signals to the Texas courts."

Subsequently to this case, the Supreme Court held in Atkins v. Virginia that execution of persons who are mentally retarded is unconstitutional. This functionally prevented Penry from receiving the death penalty, and he would later be resentenced to life imprisonment.

The decision was part of a series of decisions on the death penalty, all dealing with the "national consensus" on the question.

See also
 Antiterrorism and Effective Death Penalty Act of 1996

References

External links
 

United States sentencing case law
United States Supreme Court cases
United States Supreme Court cases of the Rehnquist Court
2001 in United States case law